Erasmia is a suburb in the northern outskirts of Centurion in the City of Tshwane Metropolitan Municipality. Originally a whites-only area under apartheid, increasing numbers of Indians from neighbouring Laudium moved in, following the abolition of segregation in the early 1990s, and the construction of a direct link road between the two areas. Erasmia lies west of the R55 route. In 2001, 65.72% of the population was Indian, and by 2011, Indians made up 77.03% of the population. The area called Christoburg is for census  and other purposes usually treated as part of Erasmia.

History
It became a suburb on 4 September 1946 and was named after WFE Erasmus. It was created out of the farms Mooiplaas No. 69 and Zwartkop No. 476.

References

Suburbs of Centurion, Gauteng